Swannington railway station was a railway station at Swannington in North West Leicestershire, England.

Swannington has had two railway stations. The first opened in 1832 as the western terminus of the Leicester and Swannington Railway. Trains reached it via the Swannington Incline, which had a 1 in 17 gradient and was worked by a stationary engine.

The extension avoided the Swannington Incline by taking a new alignment beginning from a junction east of Swannington near . The new line passed south of the original terminus and a new Swannington station was opened on it, leaving the original Swannington terminus to remain as a goods depot.

The second Swannington station was closed in 1951 but the line remains open for freight traffic.

Former Midland Railway stations
Disused railway stations in Leicestershire
Railway stations in Great Britain opened in 1832
Railway stations in Great Britain closed in 1951